The Secret Servix Scooter Club is an all female vintage scooter club started in Denver, Colorado, in 1995. The members all ride vintage Vespas and Lambrettas, with vintage being defined as metal-bodied, geared (manual shifting) scooters.

To date, The Secret Servix is the longest running, all female, all vintage scooter club in the United States. Members range in age, professions and geographical locations with the majority of active members in Denver and others in Florida, Salt Lake City, San Francisco, Los Angeles and New York City.

References

Scooter clubs
1995 establishments in Colorado